Mayiladuthurai district is one of the 38 districts of the state of Tamil Nadu in India. The district headquarters is located at Mayiladuthurai.

Geography 
The district is bounded on the north by Cuddalore district, on the west by Thanjavur district, on the south by Tiruvarur district and Karaikal district of Puducherry, and the Bay of Bengal to the east.

The district is situated in the fertile delta of the Kaveri and is entirely flat plain. The Kaveri, as well as many of its distributaries, flows through the district and enters the sea here. Most of the northern border with Cuddalore is formed by the Kollidam River.

Taluks 
As of 2020, when Mayiladuthurai District was carved out of Nagapattinam it had the following taluks:
Kuthalam taluk
Mayiladuthurai taluk
Sirkazhi taluk
Tharangambadi taluk

Demographics 

At the time of the 2011 census, Mayiladuthurai district had a population of 918,356, of which 176,568 (19.23%) lived in urban areas. Mayiladuthurai district has a sex ratio of 1029 females per 1000 males and Scheduled Castes and Scheduled Tribes made up 32.31% and 0.23% of the population respectively. Tamil is the predominant language, spoken by 99.32% of the population.

Politics 

|}

See also
List of districts of Tamil Nadu
Anaimelagaram
Ananthanallur
Othavanthankudi

References

External links 
 Mayiladuthurai District

 
Districts of Tamil Nadu